Roberto Sabatini (born 24 October 1969) is an Italian-Australian aerospace researcher and academic specializing in avionics, spaceflight and robotics/autonomous systems. Currently, he holds the positions of full professor at Khalifa University of Science and Technology (UAE)  and honorary professor at RMIT University (Australia), as well as other visiting and consulting appointments in North America, Europe, Australia, Asia, South Africa, and the Middle East.

Research work
Sabatini's research addresses key contemporary challenges in aerospace and defense systems design, testing and certification. The Australian Research Special Report 2021 recognized Sabatini as the top national scientist in the field of Aerospace Engineering and Aviation, and the 2021 Stanford ranking placed him among the top 2% globally of scientists in the same discipline.

Fellow
Institution of Engineers, Australia
Royal Institute of Navigation
Royal Aeronautical Society

Editor
Editor, Progress in Aerospace Sciences
Section Editor-in-Chief, Robotics (Aerospace Systems)
Senior Editor, IEEE Transactions on Aerospace and Electronic Systems
Associate Editor, Aerospace Science and Technology
Associate Editor, Journal of Navigation
Associate Editor, Aerospace
Associate Editor, Robotica

Awards and honours
Arch T. Colwell Merit Award - Society of Automotive Engineering (2015)
Science Award - Sustainable Aviation Research Society (2016)
Scientist of the Year - Australian Defense Industry Awards (2019).
Sabatini was recognized as Best-in-Field Scientist by The Australian (2021).
Distinguished Leadership Award from Aviation/Aerospace Australia in 2021.

References

External links 

Living people
Academic staff of Khalifa University
1969 births
Fellows of the Royal Aeronautical Society
Australian aerospace engineers
Australian people of Italian descent
Aeronautical engineering academics